Galliera is a comune (municipality) in the Metropolitan City of Bologna in the Italian region Emilia-Romagna, located about  north of Bologna.

Galliera borders the following municipalities: Malalbergo, Pieve di Cento, Poggio Renatico, San Pietro in Casale, Terre del Reno.

People
Josephine of Leuchtenberg (later Queen of Norway and Sweden) was made Duchess of Galliera at age 6 by Napoleon I in 1813.

References

External links
 Official website

Cities and towns in Emilia-Romagna